Bayramören District is a district of the Çankırı Province of Turkey. Its seat is the town of Bayramören. Its area is 310 km2, and its population is 2,433 (2021).

Composition
There is one municipality in Bayramören District:
 Bayramören

There are 27 villages in Bayramören District:

 Akgüney 
 Akseki 
 Belenli 
 Boğazkaya 
 Çakırbağ 
 Çayırcık 
 Dalkoz 
 Dereköy 
 Dolaşlar 
 Erenler 
 Feriz 
 Göynükören 
 Harmancık 
 İncekaya 
 Karakuzu 
 Karataş 
 Kavakköy 
 Koçlu 
 Oluklu 
 Oymaağaç 
 Sarıkaya 
 Topçu 
 Üçgazi 
 Yaylatepesi 
 Yazıören 
 Yurtpınar 
 Yusufoğlu

References

Districts of Çankırı Province